The diocese of Polog and Kumanovo was a diocese of the Macedonian Orthodox Church – Ohrid Archbishopric in North Macedonia. It ceased to exist on 19 June 2013 when it was divided into the diocese of Kumanovo and Osogovo and the Diocese of Tetovo and Gostivar. From 1971 until his death in 2013, the head of Diocese of Polog and Kumanovo was Kiril.

See also
 Kiril of Polog and Kumanovo
 Diocese of Kumanovo and Osogovo
 List of Metropolitans of Diocese of Kumanovo and Osogovo

References

External links
 Official Page of Diocese of Polog and Kumanovo
 Diocese of Polog and Kumanovo on MOC-OA Site

Macedonian Orthodox dioceses
Bogovinje Municipality
Brvenica Municipality
Gostivar Municipality
Jegunovce Municipality
Mavrovo and Rostuša Municipality
Tearce Municipality
Tetovo Municipality
Vrapčište Municipality
Kumanovo Municipality
Kratovo Municipality
Kriva Palanka Municipality
Želino Municipality
Rankovce Municipality
Lipkovo Municipality
Staro Nagoričane Municipality
Dioceses in North Macedonia